Lyubov Valeriyivna Basova, née Shulika (born 16 July 1988), is a Ukrainian track cyclist.

At the 2012 Summer Olympics, she competed in the Women's team sprint for the national team, along with the individual sprint and the keirin. At the 2016 Olympics, she was the only Ukrainian track cyclist, qualifying for the women's keirin.

Career results

2008
UEC European U23 Track Championships
2nd  Sprint
3rd  Keirin
2009
UEC European U23 Track Championships
1st  Keirin
1st  Sprint
2015
Grand Prix Galichyna
1st Sprint
1st Keirin
2nd 500m Time Trial
Grand Prix of Poland
2nd Team Sprint (with Olena Starikova
3rd Sprint
Grand Prix Minsk
3rd Sprint
3rd Team Sprint, (with Olena Starikova)
3rd Team Sprint, Memorial of Alexander Lesnikov (with Olena Starikova)
Prova Internacional de Anadia
3rd Keirin
3rd Sprint
2017
Grand Prix Galichyna
1st Keirin
1st Sprint
1st 500m Time Trial
3rd Keirin, UEC European Track Championships
2021
6th Keirin, Olympic Games

References

External links

Ukrainian female cyclists
1988 births
Living people
Olympic cyclists of Ukraine
Cyclists at the 2012 Summer Olympics
Cyclists at the 2016 Summer Olympics
Cyclists at the 2020 Summer Olympics
Ukrainian track cyclists
Place of birth missing (living people)
Sportspeople  from Vinnytsia
Universiade medalists in cycling
Universiade silver medalists for Ukraine
European Games competitors for Ukraine
Cyclists at the 2019 European Games
21st-century Ukrainian women